Provotorovsky is a rural locality (a khutor) in Dubovskoye Rural Settlement, Uryupinsky District, Volgograd Oblast, Russia. The population was 302 as of 2010. There are 3 streets.

Geography 
Provotorovsky is located in forest steppe, 38 km south of Uryupinsk (the district's administrative centre) by road. Zakhopersky is the nearest rural locality.

References 

Rural localities in Uryupinsky District